Carlos Becerra (born July 12, 1991) is an American actor, producer and entrepreneur. Becerra debuted as the host of Discovery Channel TV series Carspotting.

Early life 

Carlos is the host of Carspotting and runs several businesses, including "Imports & Classics" which was the focus of the series.

In an interview with The Bellingham Herald, Becerra said, "I’ve been a car guy my whole life … Whatcom County is full of old cars. You drive around the backroads and you see a lot of cars by barns or sitting in fields."

As a teenager, according to the outlet, Carlos worked in berry fields and sold from his own stand. After graduating high school, he started buying cars and shipping them out of state.

See also 
 List of people from Washington (state)

References

External links 
 

1991 births
20th-century American male actors
21st-century American male actors
American male film actors
Living people
People from Bellingham, Washington